Lis (Portuguese: Rio Lis) is a river in  central Portugal, flowing mainly through the district and city of Leiria ending in Vieira de Leiria in the Atlantic coast.

References

Rivers of Portugal